Bharat Ek Khoj is a 53-episode Indian historical drama based on the book The Discovery of India (1946) by Jawaharlal Nehru that covers a 5,000-year history of India from its beginnings to independence from the British in 1947. The drama was directed, written and produced by Shyam Benegal with cinematographer V. K. Murthy in 1988 for state-owned Doordarshan. Shama Zaidi co-wrote the script. Its cast included Om Puri, Roshan Seth, Tom Alter and Sadashiv Amrapurkar. Jawaharlal Nehru was portrayed by Roshan Seth, the same role he portrayed in the Oscar-winning film Gandhi.

Production designer Nitish Roy with assistants Samir Chanda and Nitin Desai built 144 sets.

Cast and episode list

Broadcast
The 53 episodes series was launched in November 1988 which coincide with the birth centenary of Nehru. The series was re-telecasted on DD Bharati from 27 May 2013 on the occasion of 49th death anniversary of Jawaharlal Nehru.

See also
 Pradhanmantri
 Bharatvarsh (TV series)
 List of television shows based on Indian history

References

External links
 

Indian period television series
Indian historical television series
1980s Indian television series
Television shows based on non-fiction books
1988 Indian television series debuts
Cultural depictions of Akbar
Cultural depictions of Mahatma Gandhi
Cultural depictions of Jawaharlal Nehru
Mughal Empire in fiction
DD National original programming
1989 Indian television series endings
Cultural depictions of Shah Jahan
Cultural depictions of Aurangzeb
Cultural depictions of Rani Padmini
Cultural depictions of Indian monarchs
Television series based on the Ramayana
Television series based on Mahabharata
Krishna in popular culture
Hindu mythology in popular culture
Television series about Buddhism
Cultural depictions of Gautama Buddha
Cultural depictions of Gilgamesh
Works based on the Epic of Gilgamesh
Cultural depictions of Ashoka